Herman Meyboom (23 August 1889, in Surabaya – after 1912) was a Belgian water polo player and freestyle swimmer who competed in the 1908 and 1912 Summer Olympics.

Meyboom is the youngest male Olympic silver medalist in water polo. On 22 July 1908, he won an Olympic silver medal at the age of 18 years and 334 days.

In 1908 and 1912 he also participated in the 100-metre freestyle events, but was eliminated in the first round in each.

See also
 List of Olympic medalists in water polo (men)

References

External links
 

1889 births
Year of death missing
Belgian male water polo players
Belgian male freestyle swimmers
Water polo players at the 1908 Summer Olympics
Water polo players at the 1912 Summer Olympics
Swimmers at the 1908 Summer Olympics
Swimmers at the 1912 Summer Olympics
Olympic water polo players of Belgium
Olympic swimmers of Belgium
Olympic silver medalists for Belgium
Olympic bronze medalists for Belgium
Sportspeople from Surabaya
Olympic medalists in water polo
Medalists at the 1912 Summer Olympics
Medalists at the 1908 Summer Olympics
20th-century Belgian people